Anders Johan Sjögren (also spelled Andreas Johan Sjögren; May 8, 1794 in Iitti, Finland – January 18, 1855 in St. Petersburg, Russia) was a Finnish linguist, ethnographer, historian and explorer. He is known especially for uncovering the Veps people.

1794 births
1855 deaths
Linguists from Finland
Finnish Finno-Ugrists
Full members of the Saint Petersburg Academy of Sciences